In mathematics, in the field of group theory, the Baer–Specker group, or Specker group, named after Reinhold Baer and Ernst Specker, is an example of an infinite Abelian group which is a building block in the structure theory of such groups.

Definition
The Baer–Specker group is the group B = ZN of all integer sequences with componentwise addition, that is, the direct product of countably many copies of Z.  It can equivalently be described as the additive group of formal power series with integer coefficients.

Properties
Reinhold Baer proved in 1937 that this group is not free abelian; Specker proved in 1950 that every countable subgroup of B is free abelian.

The group of homomorphisms from the Baer–Specker group to a free abelian group of finite rank is a free abelian group of countable rank. This provides another proof that the group is not free.

See also
 Slender group

Notes

References
.
.
.
.
Cornelius, E. F., Jr. (2009), "Endomorphisms and product bases of the Baer-Specker group", Int'l J Math and Math Sciences, 2009, article 396475, https://www.hindawi.com/journals/ijmms/

External links
 Stefan Schröer, Baer's Result: The Infinite Product of the Integers Has No Basis

Abelian group theory